Raphael Koch (born 20 January 1990) is a footballer from Switzerland who currently plays as a defender for FC Solothurn. He is the older brother of footballer Philippe Koch.

References

External links
 Profile at football.ch

1990 births
Living people
Swiss men's footballers
Switzerland under-21 international footballers
Swiss Super League players
FC Zürich players
Association football defenders
People from Hochdorf District
Sportspeople from the canton of Lucerne